Indian National Trinamool Trade Union Congress is a trade union organisation of India politically associated with All India Trinamool Congress. All India President of Indian National Trinamool Trade Union Congress is Dola Sen.

Trade unions in India
National trade union centres of India
Trinamool Congress
Organizations with year of establishment missing